Gordon Aspinall (1923 – 15 June 2013) was an English professional rugby league footballer who played in the 1940s.

Background
Gordon Aspinall's birth was registered in Wigan, Lancashire, England.

International honours
Gordon Aspinall won a cap for England while at Liverpool Stanley in 1943 against Wales.

Death
Aspinall died in Sheffield on 15 June 2013, at the age of 90.

References

1923 births
2013 deaths
England national rugby league team players
English rugby league players
Liverpool City (rugby league) players
Rugby league players from Wigan
Rugby league wingers